Tyson Hepburn is a Vancouver-based Television creator, director and producer. He is also an Executive Producer at Mayhem Entertainment.

Career
Hepburn's career has mainly focused on documentaries and reality television productions in which he has contributed as creator, director, and producer. Pyros, Jacked!, and Cold Water Cowboys are some of the TV series created by Hepburn. Cold Water Cowboys, a series about Newfoundland fishermen, received the highest ratings ever as a Discovery Channel premiere. The series was distributed by Netflix internationally. Pyros was aired in more than 120 countries.

Hepburn worked John Driftmier to develop the series Dangerous Flights and Cold Water Cowboys. Driftmier lost his life in a plane crash during production for Dangerous Flights. Hepburn then formed Mayhem Entertainment with Matt Shewchuck, with Rust Valley Restorers as their first production in 2017. The series has gone on to become a global hit on History Channel Canada and Netflix International. In early 2020, the series garnered a nomination for the Canadian Screen Awards.

Television series
 Rust Valley Restorers
 Pets & Pickers
 The Dog Dudes
 Cold Water Cowboys
 Keeping Canada Safe
 Selling Big
 Jacked!
 Dangerous Flights
 Cold Diggers
 Bomb Hunters
 License to Drill
 Cash Atom
 Intervention
 Pyros

References

External links
Official website

Canadian television producers
Canadian television directors
Year of birth missing (living people)
Living people